Continuous fiber reinforced thermoplastic, is a composite material that contains high-performance continuous fiber, such as carbon fiber, glass fiber, or aramid fiber that is impregnated in a matrix of thermoplastics like polycarbonates. CFRTP is producible into both tape and sheet formats that can later be formed using thermoforming techniques.

References

Composite materials
Fibre-reinforced polymers